Fabrice Twagizimana (born 8 October 1990) is a Rwandan footballer who plays as a defensive midfielder for Étoile de l'Est.

References 

1990 births
Living people
Rwandan footballers
Rwanda international footballers
Police F.C. (Rwanda) players
Association football midfielders